The Christian Defense League was founded as a white supremacist activist organization in California, and it later moved to Louisiana. According to the Anti-Defamation League, it also had a paramilitary function.

The initial history of the organization is unclear due to contradictory accounts. According to  Bertrand Comparet and Richard Girnt Butler, they founded the organization, with Butler being its national director from 1962–1965. With the death of Wesley Swift, Butler took over as the head of Church of Jesus Christ, Christian. However, William Potter Gale claimed that he had founded the CDL along with San Jacinto Capt sometime between 1957 and 1962, later bringing in Butler and Comparet.

An introductory mailing for the Christian Defense League lead with the following

When Richard Girnt Butler left California and moved to Idaho in 1973, leadership of the CDL passed to James K. Warner. Warner had previous associations with the National Socialist White People's Party, as well as Odinism. When he moved to Los Angeles, he initially associated with neo-nazi groups, but he ultimately converted to Identity. Under Warner, the CDL was moved to Baton Rouge, Louisiana where it merged with the New Christian Crusade Church. This is where most of its paramilitary activity occurred.

References

External links
James K. Warner collection at the University of Wyoming – American Heritage Center

Christian Identity
White supremacist groups in the United States
American Christian political organizations